Grinding Stone is the only album by The Gary Moore Band. Released in 1973, it was recorded between Moore's leaving Skid Row and joining Thin Lizzy.

It contains a mixture of styles that differ from his later solo work. Moore did not release another solo album until 1978's Back on the Streets.

Background
Moore put the band together after leaving the group Skid Row, signing to CBS Records. At the time, Moore was unsure about which direction he wanted to take his music in, and consequently the album features a variety of styles. These included the title track's blues shuffle, double-tracked lead guitars on "Time To Heal" and "Spirit", Latin rhythms reminiscent of Santana, and slide guitar on "Boogie My Way Back Home". Keyboardist Jan Schelhaas guested on the album, as did Irish guitarist Philip Donnelly.

Moore split up the band so he could join Thin Lizzy as a replacement for Eric Bell. Drummer Pearse Kelly briefly covered for Thin Lizzy's Brian Downey while the latter was ill. He would revisit some of the jazz fusion styles explored on the album with the group Colosseum II.

Reception
The album was favourably reviewed by Billboard, who thought "Sail Across the Mountain" was its strongest track. It was not commercially successful, and did not chart. Moore would not release another album under his own name until Back on the Streets five years later, after several years in Colosseum II and another stint in Thin Lizzy.

A retrospective review in AllMusic was mixed, saying that while the eclectic and varied styles were interesting, it was not Moore's best album. However, the reviewer felt the album helped explain Moore's change in styles between Skid Row and Colosseum II, and concluded that it was an overlooked album in his solo career.

Track listing

Personnel
The Gary Moore Band
Gary Moore – lead guitar, vocals
John Curtis – bass
Pearse Kelly – drums, percussion

Additional personnel
Frank Boylan – bass
Philip Donnelly – rhythm guitar
Jan Schelhaas – keyboards

Production
Martin Birch – producer, engineer

References

Gary Moore albums
1973 debut albums
Albums produced by Martin Birch
CBS Records albums